The Javan blue robin (Myiomela diana) is a species of bird in the family Muscicapidae.  It is endemic to the Indonesian island of Java. Its natural habitat is subtropical or tropical moist montane forests. The Sumatran blue robin (Myiomela sumatrana) was formerly considered a subspecies of M. diana, with both the Javan and Sumatran subspecies being grouped under the name Sunda robin.

References

 BirdLife International 2004.  Cinclidium diana.   2006 IUCN Red List of Threatened Species.   Downloaded on 25 July 2007.

Javan blue robin
Birds of Sumatra
Birds of Java
Javan blue robin
Taxonomy articles created by Polbot